Caitlin Clarke (born Katherine Anne Clarke, May 3, 1952 – September 9, 2004) was an American theater and film actress best known for her role as Valerian in the 1981 fantasy film Dragonslayer and for her role as Charlotte Cardoza in the 1998–1999 Broadway musical Titanic.

Biography
Clarke was born Catherine Ann Clarke in Pittsburgh, the oldest of five sisters, the youngest of whom is Victoria Clarke.  Her family moved to Sewickley when she was ten.

Clarke received her B.A. in theater arts from Mount Holyoke College in 1974 and her M.F.A. from the Yale School of Drama in 1978.  During her final year at Yale, Clarke performed with the Yale Repertory Theater in such plays as Tales from the Vienna Woods.

The first few years of Clarke's professional career were largely theatrical, apart from her role in Dragonslayer. After appearing in three Broadway plays in 1985, Clarke moved to Los Angeles for several years as a film and television actress. She appeared in the 1986 film Crocodile Dundee as Simone, a friendly prostitute. She returned to theater in the early 1990s, and to Broadway as Charlotte Cardoza in Titanic.

Clarke was diagnosed with ovarian cancer in 2000. She returned to Pittsburgh to teach theater at the University of Pittsburgh and at the Pittsburgh Musical Theater's  Rauh Conservatory as well as to perform in Pittsburgh theatre until her death on September 9, 2004.

Stage

Broadway
1983 - Teaneck Tanzi: The Venus Flytrap
1985 - The Marriage of Figaro
1985 - Arms and the Man
1985 - Strange Interlude
1998 - Titanic: A New Musical

Off-Broadway
1979 - Othello
1981 - No End of Blame
1983 - Summer
1984 - Total Eclipse
1984 - Quartermaine's Terms
1984 - Thin Ice
1994 - Three Birds Alighting On A Field
1994 - Unexpected Tenderness

Regional
1978 - Tales from the Vienna Woods (New Haven)
1979 - The Winter's Tale (Washington)
1980 - Bal (Chicago)
1981 - Plenty (Chicago)
1982 - Summer Vacation Madness (Minneapolis)
1984 - As You Like It (San Diego)
1984 - Not Quite Jerusalem (New Haven)
1989 - Our Country's Good (Los Angeles)
1991 - The Queen And The Rebels (Baltimore)
1996 - Mrs. Warren's Profession (New Haven)
1997 - Indiscretions (Dallas)
1997 - The Glass Menagerie (Portland, Maine)
1999 - Griller (Baltimore)
2000 - Who's Afraid of Virginia Woolf (Rochester, NY)
2002 - The Gigli Concert (Pittsburgh)
2002 - Aristocrats (Pittsburgh)

Film
 1981 Dragonslayer as Valerian
 1986 Crocodile Dundee as Simone
 1988 Kenny (a.k.a. The Kid Brother) as Sharon
 1989 The Big Picture as Sharon
 1989 Penn & Teller Get Killed as Carlotta / Officer McNamara
 1994 Blown Away as Officer Rita
 1997 Cost of Living as Annie
 1997 A Cure For Serpents (Short) as Mother
 1999 Joe the King as Pat
 2001 Never Again as Allison (final film role)

Television
Series: Northern Exposure, The Equalizer, Once a Hero, Moonlighting, Sex And The City, Law & Order ("Menace", "Juvenile", "Stiff"), Matlock ("The Witness").

Movies: Mayflower Madam (1986), Love, Lies and Murder (1991), The Stepford Husbands (1996).

References

External links
 

 

1952 births
2004 deaths
Actresses from Pittsburgh
American film actresses
American stage actresses
American television actresses
Mount Holyoke College alumni
Deaths from ovarian cancer
Yale School of Drama alumni
Deaths from cancer in Pennsylvania
20th-century American actresses
Sewickley Academy alumni
21st-century American women